Summer Nights (German: Sommernächte) is a 1944 German comedy film directed by Karl Ritter and starring René Deltgen, Suse Graf and Ernst von Klipstein. Location shooting took place in East Prussia, particularly around the Masurian Lakes. It was shot at the National Studios in Berlin. The film's sets were designed by the art director Wilhelm Vorwerg.

Cast
 René Deltgen as Dr. Thomas
 Suse Graf as Gabriele
 Ernst von Klipstein as 	Kuno
 Jutta von Alpen as Uschi Brosseit
 Franz Weber as Dunhus
 Charlotte Ritter as 	Ernestine
 Leopold von Ledebur as General A.D. Brosseit
 Erich Dunskus as Kalaut
 Karl Hannemann as Gemeindevorsteher
 Dorothea Thiess as 	Pauline
 Irmgard Thielke as 	Magd

References

Bibliography
 Kreimeier, Klaus. The Ufa Story: A History of Germany's Greatest Film Company, 1918-1945. University of California Press, 1999.
 Rentschler, Eric. The Ministry of Illusion: Nazi Cinema and Its Afterlife. Harvard University Press, 1996.

External links 
 

1944 films
Films of Nazi Germany
German comedy films
1944 comedy films
1940s German-language films
German black-and-white films
1940s German films
Films directed by Karl Ritter
UFA GmbH films

de:Sommernächte